Stefan Radulovic (born 1 January 2002) is an Austrian professional footballer who plays as a midfielder for Juniors OÖ.

Career
Radulovic is a product of the youth academies of Wiener Viktoria, TWL Elektra and Austria Wien. On 2 June 2019, he was promote to Austria Wien's reserves. He made his professional debut with Austria Wien in an Austrian Cup win over Wiener Sport-Club in October 2020. On 11 June 2021, he transferred to LASK, signing a contract until 2024. He was immediately loaned to Juniors OÖ in the 2. Liga for the 2021-22 season.

International career
Radulovic is a youth international for Austria, having represented the Austria U17s and U18s.

References

External links
 
 OEFB Profile

2002 births
Living people
Footballers from Vienna
Austrian footballers
FK Austria Wien players
LASK players
FC Juniors OÖ players
Austrian Football Bundesliga players
2. Liga (Austria) players
Austrian Regionalliga players
Association football midfielders